Percy D. Bryant (June 12, 1897 – June 5, 1960) was an American bobsledder who competed in the early 1930s. He won the silver medal in the four-man event at the 1932 Winter Olympics in Lake Placid.

References
Bobsleigh four-man Olympic medalists for 1924, 1932-56, and since 1964 
Percy Bryant's profile at Sports Reference.com

1897 births
1960 deaths
American male bobsledders
Bobsledders at the 1932 Winter Olympics
Medalists at the 1932 Winter Olympics
Olympic silver medalists for the United States in bobsleigh